The Douglas Lake Cattle Company is Canada's largest working cattle ranch, usually known as the Douglas Lake Ranch. Founded June 30, 1886, it has been operating continuously since. This date also marks the completion of the last leg of the first transcontinental rail line of the Canadian Pacific Railway from Montreal to Vancouver.

In response to booming demand for beef in rapidly growing Vancouver, the Interior stock industry went into high gear in the wake of the railway's opening, spurring on something of a golden age in BC ranching. In 1907 the Nicola branch line of the CPR was built into the Nicola Valley to serve the booming stock operation at Douglas Lake, which was already one of the country's largest and for many years second only to the sprawling Gang Ranch on the west side of the Fraser, which has since shrunk in scale, leaving the Douglas Lake as the largest. The ranch includes leased grazing land as well as directly leased or titled lands, and extends to the edge of metropolitan Kamloops and towards Shuswap Lake, spanning most of the high country of the northeastern Thompson Plateau.

The Douglas Lake Cattle Company has faced many controversies. It has been claimed that early on, the ranch's land holdings were expanded by pressing large amounts of cattle into the pastures of smaller neighbours. While the cattle would later be removed the damage was done. With their feed for the year consumed by Douglas Lake's herd, the homesteaders would be forced to sell. Douglas Lake Cattle Company has also aggressively restricted access to both private and public lands. By buying up thin strips of land along major arteries they are able to control wide tracts of public range. In many cases locked gates were placed where Douglas Lake has no legal claim to the property. While this is claimed to preserve grasslands, some say it appears to be a business maneuver. Douglas Lake Cattle Company charges up to $100.00 a day to fly fish their private lakes (that they maintain by stocking, cleaning, aerating, etc.). There are public lakes that you can access for  free (Douglas Lake is public) or pay an access fee (Salmon Lake).

See also 

 List of historic ranches in British Columbia
 Merritt, British Columbia
 Quilchena, British Columbia

References

External links 
 Official history
 Map showing CPR spur lines in the Nicola-Similkameen (shaded blocks at right are the Douglas Lake Ranch and Indian Reserves; "Nicola" is the ranch's station and cattleyards, called Upper Nicola today)
 Buckaroos in BC: the Story of Ranching in British Columbia Virtual exhibit on the history of ranching in British Columbia.

History of British Columbia
Nicola Country
Ranches in British Columbia
Shuswap Country
Thompson Country
Cattle companies